Allium pallens is a species of wild onion native to the Mediterranean region and Middle East from Portugal and Algeria to Iran.

Description 

Allium pallens produces a single egg-shaped bulb. Scape is up to 50 cm tall, round in cross-section. Leaves are long, narrow, and fleshy. Flowers are bell-shaped, some nodding while others in the same umbel erect, the tepals white or pale purple with prominent green or purple midveins.

Taxonomy 

A. paniculatum is placed within section Codonoprasum, subgenus Allium. There is some degree of uncertainty with regards to the relationships of taxa within the section. The Plant List gives A. pallens as an accepted name, but The World Checklist of Selected Plant Families treats it as a subspecies of Allium paniculatum, Allium paniculatum subsp. pallens (L.) K.Richt. Furthermore a number of synonyms listed in The Plant List, such as Allium sternii, are treated as separate species by The World Checklist.

Taxa formerly included
 Allium pallens var. grandiflorum, now called Allium litardierei 
 Allium pallens var. pseudooleraceum, now called Allium oleraceum 
 Allium pallens var. savii, now called Allium savii  
 Allium pallens subsp. siciliense , now called Allium lehmannii  
 Allium pallens subsp. tenuiflorum , now called Allium tenuiflorum

References

pallens
Garden plants
Plants described in 1762
Taxa named by Carl Linnaeus